Trachysomus thomsoni is a species of beetle in the family Cerambycidae. It was described by Per Olof Christopher Aurivillius in 1923. It is known from Colombia and Panama.

References

Onciderini
Beetles described in 1923